Chea Samnang (born 15 May 1994) is a Cambodian footballer who plays for the Preah Khan Reach Svay Rieng in the Cambodian League and the Cambodia national football team.

References

1994 births
Living people
Cambodian footballers
Cambodia international footballers
Association football midfielders
Place of birth missing (living people)